is a Japanese manga artist best known as the creator of Amaenaideyo!!, which was adapted into an anime television series and distributed in the US under the title Ah My Buddha, and for the Young King magazine series Go! Tenba Cheerleaders!.

Toshinori also provided artwork for the Comic Rush manga Orange Delivery, which was written by Bohemian K.-->

Works
 Ah My Buddha (story and art)
 Deban desu yo? Kondō-san! (story and art)
 Go! Tenba Cheerleaders (story and art)
 Haruka Suitact! (story and art)
 Kurogane Hime (story)
 Orange Delivery (art)
 Mizutama Rindō (story)
 Yankee JK Kuzuhana-chan (story and art)

References

External links

 Toshinori Sogabe manga at Media Arts Database 
Toshinori Sogabe at Mangareview.com

Manga artists
Living people
Japanese artists
Year of birth missing (living people)